The 1998 Pennsylvania gubernatorial election was held on November 3, 1998. The candidates were incumbent Republican Tom Ridge, Democrat Ivan Itkin, Constitutionalist Peg Luksik and Libertarian Ken Krawchuk. Ridge, a popular moderate, won with 57 percent of the votes cast. 

As of 2022, this 1998 gubernatorial election was the last time in which Delaware, Lackawanna and Montgomery counties voted for the Republican candidate, and was the last time a Republican was re-elected as Governor of Pennsylvania. It was also the first time since 1930 that Greene County, Fayette County, and Washington County voted Republican.

Primary elections 
Incumbent Governor Ridge ran unopposed for the Republican nomination, and was endorsed by multiple newspapers across the state, including the York Daily Record. State Representative Ivan Itkin from Pittsburgh defeated former Auditor General and US Representative Don Bailey from Greensburg and private detective and anti-corruption activist Bill Keisling from York. Itkin, although not well known in the state, was a powerful figure in the legislature and had the backing of the party establishment, while the conservative Bailey drew strong union support.

General election

Candidates
Ivan Itkin, State Representative (Democratic)
Running mate: Marjorie Margolies-Mezvinsky, former U.S. Representative
Ken Krawchuk, technology consultant (Libertarian)
Running mate: Henry Haller, attorney
Peg Luksik, director of an anti-abortion organization and candidate in 1994 (Constitution)
Running mate: Jim Clymer, attorney and nominee for Lt. Governor in 1994
Tom Ridge, incumbent Governor (Republican)
Running mate: Mark Schweiker, incumbent Lieutenant Governor

Campaign
During this election cycle, Democrats struggled with fundraising issues and had difficulty recruiting a top tier candidate. Itkin, who had little name recognition statewide, was considered to be a sacrificial lamb. Peg Luksik, who was well known as an outspoken opponent of abortion, ran as a strong third party contender for the second consecutive election cycle; she emphasized the pro-choice stances of both candidates and drew votes in the state's rural, conservative center. However, Ridge's victory was never in doubt, as he ran on a generally positive record from his prior term and a combination of traditional Republican strategies (such as his "tough on crime" image) combined with his ability to somewhat undercut Democratic support (such as through his labor ties).

Results

References

Sources
 

1998
Gubernatorial
Pennsylvania